The year 1659 in music involved some significant events.

Events 
Final printing of Parthenia, the first printed collection of music for keyboard in Britain.
Fray García de San Francisco founds a Catholic mission in what is now El Paso, Texas, making him perhaps the first music teacher in the future United States.

Publications 
Giovanni Battista Granata – Soavi concenti di sonate musicali per la chitarra spagnuola..., a collection of guitar music, published in Bologna
Anthoni van Noordt – Tabulatuur-boeck van psalmen en fantasyen (Tablature-book of psalms and fantasies), a collection of organ music, published in Amsterdam
Christopher Simpson – The Division Viol, a set of practical instructions, published in London
Johann Heinrich Schmelzer – Duodena Selectarum Sonatarum

Classical music 
Georg Arnold – Canzoni ariae et sonatae, Op.3
Robert Cambert – Pastorale d'Issy (incidental music)
Maurizio Cazzati – Trio Sonatas, Op.18
Jean-Baptiste Lully 
Ballet de la Raillerie, LWV 11
Ballet de Toulouse, LWV 13
Barbara Strozzi – Diporti di Euterpe, Op.7

Opera
Antonio Bertali – Il rè Gelidoro
Robert Cambert – Pastorale d'Issy

Births 
January 17 – Antonio Veracini, violinist and composer
March 6 – Salomo Franck, librettist for Bach Cantatas
August 10 – Sybrandt van Noordt Jr., composer 
September 10 – Henry Purcell, composer
October 22 – Georg Ernst Stahl, lyricist 
October 28 – Nicholas Brady, lyricist 
date unknown 
Matteo Goffriller, cello maker
Francesco Antonio Pistocchi, composer

Deaths 
April 15 – Simon Dach, hymn-writer (born 1605)
September 27 – Andreas Tscherning, lyricist (born 1611)
October 27 – Giovanni Francesco Busenello, opera librettist
date unknown – Vinzenz Fux, composer (born c. 1606)

References

 
17th century in music
Music by year